This article lists feature-length films and full-length documentaries that were at least partly produced by the Bangladeshi film industry and were released in Bangladesh in 2019. Short films and made-for-TV films are not included. Films are ordered by domestic public release date, excluding film festivals, theatrical releases abroad, and sneak previews or screenings.

Releases

January–March

April–June

July–September

October–December

See also 
 2019 in Bangladesh

References

External links 
 List of Bangladeshi films of 2019 at Bangla Movie Database

Bangladesh
 2019